Weberei Matzingen railway station is a railway station in the municipality of Matzingen, in the Swiss canton of Thurgau. It is located on the  Frauenfeld–Wil line of Appenzell Railways.

Services 
 the following services stop at Weberei Matzingen:

References

External links 
 
 

Railway stations in the canton of Thurgau
Appenzell Railways stations